Fyodor Sergeyevich Burdykin (born 3 January 1990) is a former Russian football goalkeeper.

Club career
He played two seasons in the Russian Football National League for FC Torpedo Vladimir and FC Gazovik Orenburg.

External links
 
 

1990 births
Living people
Russian footballers
Association football goalkeepers
FC Dynamo Moscow reserves players
FC Tom Tomsk players
FC Orenburg players
FC Tyumen players
FC Khimki players
FC Torpedo Vladimir players